The Clapham Demons are an Australian rules football team who are a founding member and play in the London Conference of the British Australian Rules Football League. They are the reserves grade side of the club The Wandsworth Demons based at Clapham Common in south London.

The team was formed in 1999 due to playing numbers at the club warranting the extra capacity for players. They were entered into the BARFL Premiership and played matches against the senior sides of all the clubs, including their own. At the time the league allowed for a maximum of 11 Australian players. The rest of the side of 18, as well as the bench, had to be filled with European players. The team struggled for numbers on the European player front and rarely won matches, though never forfeited.

Regardless of the difficulties in recruiting sufficient English and European players for both the club's sides, the team played two full seasons until the London Conference was created in 2001. This competition allowed for almost all positions to be played by Australians and was intended to allow clubs to field more Australian players without reducing the integrity of the senior competition.

The team was initially joined by a third side from the club, the Stockwell Demons, though a lack of numbers and enthusiasm for the team meant that the club withdrew that team at the midway point of the season.

After being defeated in the 2003, 2005, 2006, 2007 and 2008 Grand Finals, the Clapham Demons finally won their first Conference Premiership title in 2009. The Clapham Demons won their second Premiership in 2016, in a three-point-thriller.

Honour Board

External links
 Wandsworth Demons Official Site
 Wandsworth Demons on Facebook

Australian rules football clubs in England
Australian rules football teams in London
1990 establishments in England
Australian rules football clubs established in 1990